Content in this edit is translated from the existing French Wikipedia article at :fr:Cinémathèque de Saint-Étienne; see its history for attribution.

The cinematheque of Saint-Etienne is a public film organization. It was created in 1922 under the name of the  Office du Cinema Educateur  (Office of Educational Film). Therefore, it holds many educational films. It has since gathered many amateur films and old movies. Since 1993, it is located inside the public library of Tarentaize in Saint-Etienne.

Missions 

The Cinematheque of Saint-Etienne aims at :
 Collecting, cataloging and curating 
The cinematheque collects amateur movies, periodicals, documentation and film hardware technology. It owns more than 2800 books and 120 film periodicals dating back to 1924, more than 6000 official, commercial, amateur or educational films and videos. It also holds a collection of hardware, such as cameras or projectors. 

 Showing films

The cinematheque shows two different types of films : films intended for children, either in class or not, and films intended for all audiences. It has a 110-seat theatre room (including four seats for handicapped people), a library and a place where people can see movies by themselves. Every screening is free and no reservation is required..

 Teaching 
To promote cinephilia, the cinematheque organizes debates and conferences about film history. Some activities are aimed at children in order to teach them to look at films differently.

History 

 1920 : Henry Maitte implemented an experimental service consisting in lending films and a professional film projector to elementary schools in the Loire department.
 July 1921 : The city council of Saint-Étienne decided to install an educational projector in every classroom of every primary school.
 1922 : The Loire general council bought 30 educational films, from Pathé and Gaumont and created the Office of Educational Film, which would become the Cinematheque.
 1924 : The Office had a collection of 98 educational films.
 1926 : The film archives of Saint-Etienne were created. The Office acquired a 35mm film camera and shot its first film in the Office of Saint-Etienne.
 1932 : All the French Offices of Educational Film joined the Ligue de l'Enseignement and created the UFOCEL (French Union of the Offices of Secular Educational Film).
 1935 : The Office got equipped with the 36mm film format, both silent and with sound.
 1937 : Educational film was from now on called « documentary film ». The collection of films belonging to the city separated from the one owned by the general council and took the name of Cinematheque of Saint-Etienne.
 1939–1945 : The Cinematheque paused its activities during World War II.
 1993 : The Cinematheque moved inside the central public library of Tarentaize.

Collaborations 

The Cinematheque works in collaboration with the theatre of Saint-Etienne and other cultural associations. For example, it shows many films in cooperation with associations who fight against racism, homophobia, sexism, violence against women and overall discrimination. 
It participates in local festivals, such as Curieux Voyageurs, Regards sur la Culture d'Afrique, Face à Face or Ville en Partage and in national festivals, such as the Cinema du Reel, Jean Rouch or the Clermont-Ferrand International Short Film Festival.

 Local festivals : « Curieux voyageurs », « Regards sur la culture d'Afrique », « Face à face », « Ville en partage ».	
 National Festivals : « Cinéma du réel » by the Public Information Library in the Centre Georges Pompidou, « Jean Rouch » by the Musée de l'Homme in Paris, « Clermont-Ferrand International Short Film Festival ».

Former Presidents 

Eugène Reboul (1922–1937), M. Vicard (1936–1938), M. Cancade (1938–1947), M. Achard (1948), M. Folliet (1948–1955), M.Guilhot (1956–1962), M. Duprat (1963–1964), M. Thomas (1965–1969), M. Spagnol (1970–1974), M. Ayme (1974–1980), M. Vial (1981–2013), M. Léonard (since 2013).

Further reading
 Raymond Borde, Charles Perrin, Les Offices du cinéma éducateur et la survivance du muet, Presses Universitaires de Lyon, 1992
 Antoine Ravat, Histoire de la cinémathèque de Saint-Etienne. Au temps de l'Office du cinéma éducateur (1922–1952), Bulletin du Vieux Saint-Etienne, 1995
 Antoine Ravat, Mémoire de maîtrise d'Etudes Cinématographiques et audiovisuelles, Université Lyon II, 1996
 Frédéric Zarch, Catalogue des films projetés à Saint-Étienne avant la première guerre mondiale, PU, 2000
 Dominique Dessertine, Bernard Maradan, Patronages catholiques, patronages laïques entre les deux guerres : les enjeux de la socialisation des enfants, Cahiers d'histoire, 2002
 Josette Urberschlag, Jean Brérault, l'instituteur cinéaste : 1898–1973, Presses Universitaires de Saint-Etienne, 2007
 Frédéric Zarch, Dictionnaire historique du cinéma de Saint-Étienne, PU, 2008

External links 

 [https://web.archive.org/web/20150224030509/http://www.saint-etienne.fr/culture/mediatheques-municipales/cinematheque La cinémathèque sur le site de la ville de Saint-Étienne
 Historique de la cinémathèque de Saint-Étienne
 Historique (1981–2013) sur Forez Info
 Petite histoire du Ciné Jeunes Stéphanois sur Forez Info
 Frédéric Zarch: 100 ans de cinéma à Saint-Etienne sur Forez Info
 La cinémathèque de Saint-Etienne a 90 ans sur Forez Info
 Bulletin des bibliothèques de France

References 

Saint-Etiennei
Organizations based in Saint-Étienne